Niğde Alaaddin Mosque is a historical mosque in Niğde, Turkey.

The mosque was constructed in 1223 during the reign of Keyqubad I (r.1220–1237) of Sultanate of Rum (precursor of the Ottoman Empire). It was commissioned by Ziynettin Beşare, the local governor of Niğde in behalf of the sultan. The chief architect of the mosque was Sıddık, the son of Mahmut. His brother Gazi was his assistant.

The building material is cut stone. There are two portals: the one in the east side is monumental. The second gate is in the north side. There are three domes in the southern part of the mosque. The minaret is located in the northeastern corner of the square building. 

According to local legend, the shape of the muqarnas-carved eastern portal casts a shadow that resembles the silhouette of a crowned girl, ostensibly the founder's daughter with whom the stonemason who built the mosque fell in love.

References

Buildings and structures in Niğde Province
Mosques completed in 1223
Seljuk mosques in Turkey